Saved by the Bell is an American television sitcom that aired on NBC from 1989 to 1993.

Saved by the Bell may also refer to:
 Saved by the Bell (2020 TV series), a revival of the original series
 "Saved by the Bell" (song), a song by Robin Gibb

See also
Saved by the Belle